The Gospel of John is a 2003 epic film that recounts the life of Jesus according to the Gospel of John. The motion picture is a word-for-word adaptation of the American Bible Society's Good News Bible. This three-hour, epic, feature film follows the Gospel of John precisely, without additions to the story from the other Gospels or omissions of the Gospel's complex passages.

Cast

Production
This film was created by a constituency of artists from Canada and the United Kingdom, along with academic and theological consultants from around the world. The cast was selected primarily from the Stratford Shakespeare Festival and Soulpepper Theatre Company, as well as Britain's Royal Shakespeare Company and Royal National Theatre. The musical score, composed by Jeff Danna and created for the film, is partially based on the music of the Biblical period. The film was produced by Visual Bible International. Filming took place in Toronto, Ontario, and Almeria and Andalucia, Spain.

Reception

Critical response
 The website's critical consensus reads, "The Gospel of John takes a reverent approach to its story without ever bringing it to life, proving that cribbing from the Good Book isn't enough to guarantee a good movie." Metacritic, which uses a weighted average, assigned the film a score of 52 out of 100 based on responses from 14 critics, indicating "mixed or average reviews".

Criticism
While the film is largely a faithful depiction of the Gospel of John, one reviewer noted that the inclusion of Mary Magdalene at the Last Supper has no direct Biblical citation, and might cause issue with viewers who prefer only direct scriptural references.

See also
The Gospel of John, a 2014 word-for-word film adaptation
The Visual Bible: Matthew
The Visual Bible: Acts

References

External links
 
 
 Enthusiastic review by Andy Naselli
 Arts & Faith Top100 Spiritually Significant Films list
 The Blog on The Gospel of John Film

2003 films
Films about Jesus
British epic films
Canadian epic films
English-language Canadian films
Cultural depictions of John the Baptist
Cultural depictions of Judas Iscariot
Cultural depictions of Pontius Pilate
Films directed by Philip Saville
Films scored by Jeff Danna
Films set in Jerusalem
Films shot in Almería
Gospel of John
Portrayals of the Virgin Mary in film
Religious epic films
Portrayals of Mary Magdalene in film
Cultural depictions of Saint Peter
2000s English-language films
2000s Canadian films
2000s British films